The 1939 Argentine Primera División was the 48th season of top-flight football in Argentina. The season began on March 19 and ended on December 2. There were 18 teams in the tournament that was won by Independiente achieving its 4th league title.

A total of three teams joined the division: Argentino de Quilmes (promoted last year) and two clubs from regional Liga Rosarina, Rosario Central and Newell's Old Boys.

Paraguayan forward Arsenio Erico became topscorer for the 3rd. consecutive time, with 40 goals.

League standings

References

Argentine Primera Division
Primera Division
Argentine Primera División seasons